Air Commodore Darryn Robert Webb  is a New Zealand air force officer. During the COVID-19 pandemic in 2020, he served as head of managed isolation and quarantine (MIQ) from June to December 2020 as part of the New Zealand government's response to the virus.

Biography
Webb joined the Royal New Zealand Air Force in 1991. Beginning as a transport pilot, he later held other roles including Hercules flight commander, and deputy director of strategic commitments. He was appointed senior commander of RNZAF Base Ohakea in 2014, and in 2016 he became deputy chief of Air Force.

Early in the COVID-19 pandemic, Webb was seconded to the COVID-19 Operational Command Centre, and was involved in planning of government repatriation operations from April 2020. In June 2020, the government appointed Webb to head the MIQ system, and he served in that role until December that year, when he was succeeded by Brigadier Jim Bliss. Webb implemented an operational framework for MIQ aimed at setting consistent and safe operations and infection prevention and control standards, and during his tenure more than 80,000 people entered New Zealand through the MIQ system.

In the 2022 New Year Honours, Webb was appointed a Member of the New Zealand Order of Merit, for services to the New Zealand Defence Force.

References

Year of birth missing (living people)
Living people
Royal New Zealand Air Force personnel
Members of the New Zealand Order of Merit